ACM or A.C.M. may refer to:

Aviation
 AGM-129 ACM, 1990–2012 USAF cruise missile
 Air chief marshal
 Air combat manoeuvring or dogfighting
 Air cycle machine
 Arica Airport (Colombia) (IATA: ACM), in Arica, Amazonas, Colombia

Computing
 Abstract Control Model, for USB to act as a serial port
 Association for Computing Machinery, a US-based international learned society for computing
 Asynchronous communication mechanism
 Audio Compression Manager, Microsoft Windows codec manager

Education
 Allegany College of Maryland
 Associated Colleges of the Midwest
 Association for College Management

Music
 Academy of Contemporary Music, in Guildford, England, UK
 Academy of Country Music
 Association for Contemporary Music, in the Russian Federation

Organizations or businesses
 Alliance for Community Media
 American Center for Mobility
 American Ceylon Mission
 Anaconda Copper Mining Company
 Anti-Coalition Militia, anti-NATO Taliban in Afghanistan
 Anti-cult movement
 Association for Computing Machinery, an international computing research society
 Australasian Correctional Management
 Australian Community Media
 Australians for Constitutional Monarchy
 Netherlands Authority for Consumers and Markets (Dutch: Autoriteit Consument & Markt)

Technology
 Adaptive coding and modulation in wireless communication
 Advanced case management
 Alkyl acrylate copolymer, a type of rubber
 Aluminium composite material, used in sandwich panels
 Automated charging machine, a public mobile device charging station

Other uses
 Another Chicago Magazine, a magazine founded by Barry Silesky
 Antônio Carlos Magalhães (1927-2007), Brazilian politician
 A.C. Milan, an Italian association team
 A.C. Monza, an Italian association team
 AECOM, NYSE symbol
 Asbestos-containing material
 Attorney–client matching
 Iraqi Arabic, ISO 639-3 language code
 Automobile Club de Monaco, a motoring club based in Monaco